Lieutenant-General Sir John Hugh Sherlock Read  (6 September 1917 – 5 March 1987) was a senior British Army officer.

Biography
Born on 6 September 1917, John Read was educated at Bedford School, at Magdalene College, Cambridge, and at the Royal Military Academy, Woolwich. He gained his first commission in the British Army in 1937 when he became a Second Lieutenant in the Royal Engineers. During the Second World War he served in France, Belgium, Egypt, Palestine, Greece and Austria. Between 1945 and 1957 he served in Austria, Germany, Hong Kong and Singapore. He was Assistant Commandant of the Royal Military Academy Sandhurst, between 1966 and 1968, and Director of Military Operations at the Ministry of Defence, between 1968 and 1970. He was Assistant Chief of the Defence Staff at the Ministry of Defence, between 1970 and 1971, and Director of International Military Staff at NATO Headquarters in Brussels, between 1971 and 1975.

Lieutenant General Sir John Read retired from the British Army in 1975 and died in a car accident on 5 March 1987.

References

1917 births
1987 deaths
British Army generals
People educated at Bedford School
Alumni of Magdalene College, Cambridge
Graduates of the Royal Military Academy, Woolwich
British Army personnel of World War II
Knights Commander of the Order of the Bath
Officers of the Order of the British Empire
Place of birth missing
Royal Engineers officers
British people in colonial India